The Cork railway tunnel is a railway tunnel in Cork, Ireland. The  tunnel was built between 1847 and 1855 and runs from Blackpool to Kent Station on the Lower Glanmire Road. It is the longest operational rail tunnel in Ireland, and is included on the Record of Protected Structures maintained by Cork City Council.

Development
The tunnel was designed by architect John Benjamin Macneill for Great Southern and Western Railway (GSWR) and built by contractor William Dargan. The initial route was proposed to follow the Blackpool valley and the Kiln River. This was discounted because of the cost of property acquisition. A second route was considered along the Glen River Valley. However, the topography was found to be too steep. The third, and ultimately selected, route was for the tunnel to be bored through a sandstone ridge.

Work began on the selected route in August 1847 with the sinking of ventilation shafts, the external structures of which remain visible over the route of the tunnel. Tunneling works were undertaken simultaneously from both ends of the tunnel in 1847, and the construction headings met under Victoria (now Collins) Barracks on 29 July 1854. A few days later, the chairman, some directors, a secretary, and an engineer of GSWR walked the full length of the tunnel.

Two men died during construction of the tunnel, and many more were injured, when a mistimed explosives blast occurred on 13 March 1850. A commemorative plaque to the two men, Michael Driscoll (24) and John McDonnell (30), was dedicated where the modern road bridge passes over the northern mouth of the tunnel at The Glen.

The tunnel construction was difficult, with progress at one point falling "as low as three feet per week". Construction took seven years and completed in 1855.

Operation
First opened to traffic on 3 December 1855, the tunnel remains in use and described, as of the early 21st century, as "the longest operational tunnel in Ireland". 

The tunnel serves several routes from Kent station, including the main Dublin–Cork railway line. Track works, which involved closing the tunnel for 10 days, were undertaken during October 2021.

See also 
 Kilnap Viaduct

References 

Railway tunnels in the Republic of Ireland
Buildings and structures in Cork (city)
Transport in Cork (city)